The fifth season of the American horror anthology television series American Horror Story, subtitled Hotel, is centered around the mysterious Hotel Cortez in Los Angeles, scenario to disturbing and paranormal events overseen by its enigmatic staff. The location is loosely based on the Cecil Hotel, marked by deaths and tragedies. The ensemble cast includes Kathy Bates, Sarah Paulson, Evan Peters, Wes Bentley, Matt Bomer, Chloë Sevigny, Denis O'Hare, Cheyenne Jackson, Angela Bassett, and Lady Gaga, with all returning from previous seasons, except newcomers Jackson and Gaga. Hotel marks the first season to not feature cast mainstays Jessica Lange and Frances Conroy. Breaking from the anthological format, the season is connected to Murder House and Coven

Created by Ryan Murphy and Brad Falchuk for cable network FX, the series is produced by 20th Century Fox Television. Asylum was broadcast between October 7, 2015, to January 13, 2016, consisting of 12 episodes, despite initially reported to consists of 13 episodes. The season was confirmed in October 2014, with the subtitle Hotel announced in February 2015. As stated by Murphy and Falchuk, Hotel is thematically darker than previous installments and was inspired by old hotel horror films and actual hotels situated in downtown Los Angeles with a reputation for sinister events. The cycle also marks a return to filming in Los Angeles, where the first two seasons were shot. Hotel features one of the most expansive sets in American Horror Story history, with production designer Mark Worthington building two stories on a soundstage, along with a working elevator and stairway. In July 2015, FX launched a marketing campaign for the series, with most trailers and teasers touting Gaga's involvement.

Hotel garnered eight Emmy Award nominations, including two acting nominations for Paulson and Bates. However, it was the first time that a season of American Horror Story was not nominated for Outstanding Limited Series. In addition, Gaga won the Golden Globe Award for Best Actress – Mini-Series or Television Film, while Hotel received a nomination for Best Mini-Series or Television Film.

Cast and characters

Main

 Kathy Bates as Iris
 Sarah Paulson as Sally McKenna and Billie Dean Howard
 Evan Peters as James Patrick March
 Wes Bentley as Det. John Lowe
 Matt Bomer as Donovan
 Chloë Sevigny as Dr. Alex Lowe
 Denis O'Hare as Liz Taylor
 Cheyenne Jackson as Will Drake
 Angela Bassett as Ramona Royale
 Lady Gaga as Elizabeth "the Countess" Johnson

Special guest stars
 Mare Winningham as Hazel Evers
 Finn Wittrock as Tristan Duffy and Rudolph Valentino
 Naomi Campbell as Claudia Bankson
 Lily Rabe as Aileen Wuornos
 Gabourey Sidibe as Queenie

Recurring
 Christine Estabrook as Marcy 
 Max Greenfield as Gabriel 
 Lennon Henry as Holden Lowe 
 Richard T. Jones as Det. Andrew Hahn 
 Shree Crooks as Scarlett Lowe 
 Lyric Lennon as Lachlan Drake 
 Jessica Belkin as Wren
 Mädchen Amick as Mrs. Ellison 
 Helena Mattsson as Agnetha
 Kamilla Alnes as Vendela
 Anton Lee Starkman as Max Ellison 
 Ava Acres as Madeline 
 Alexandra Daddario as Natacha Rambova

Guest stars
 Darren Criss as Justin 
 Roxana Brusso as Dr. Kohan 
 David Naughton as Mr. Samuels 
 John Carroll Lynch as John Wayne Gacy 
 Seth Gabel as Jeffrey Dahmer 
 Anthony Ruivivar as Richard Ramirez 
 Nico Evers-Swindell as Craig 
 Robert Knepper as Lieutenant 
 Jessica Lu as Bronwyn 
 Kristen Ariza as Mrs. Pritchard 
 Mouzam Makkar as Nurse Leena 
 Matt Ross as Dr. Charles Montgomery 
 Charles Melton as Mr. Wu 
 David Barrera as Dr. Kaplan

Episodes

Production

Development

Conception and writing

On October 13, 2014, FX renewed the series for a fifth season for an October 2015 premiere. Network president John Landgraf stated that the season would necessitate a "huge reinvention" for the series. The season's subtitle was confirmed as Hotel in February 2015. The theme and Gaga's involvement were hinted in the previous installment as an image of a top hat, an arcane clue alluding to the 1935 screwball musical comedy film Top Hat, which is set in a hotel and features a song called "Cheek to Cheek", also the title of Gaga's duet album with Tony Bennett. Co-creator Ryan Murphy explained that the casting included a number of actors and singers, but would be a much darker season compared to the previous ones. Inspiration came from old hotel horror films and actual hotels situated in downtown Los Angeles, with horrific reputations. This included The Cecil, where the death of 21-year-old Canadian student Elisa Lam occurred. Murphy had watched a surveillance video of Lam in the hotel, in which she displayed erratic behavior just hours prior to her supposed death. It was around this time that the writing for Hotel was conceptualized, which included Murphy's personal phobia and fears, a fear that had not been explored since the first season.

Murphy and some of the cast appeared at the 2015 Comic-Con International and revealed further information about the series. "[Angela Bassett, Kathy Bates, Matt Bomer, Sarah Paulson, and Evan Peters] are bad boys and girls this time." Regarding the season having no primary character, Murphy confessed that "the thing that's different about the season is that before we've always been very driven by the Jessica Lange character. She was always the lead character... This year, it's a true ensemble, and I think we have more male parts and more male stories. The Wes Bentley part is really big; the Matt Bomer part is really big; Evan Peters and Finn Wittrock are really big. [But] that's not to say that the women aren't either."

Co-creator Brad Falchuk explained that like the first and second season of the series, Hotel would explore the "trapped" horror trope, though the actions would not be limited to just within the premises. "This season, the horror is sneaking out of the hotel," he added explaining that the plot would revolve around the hotel in the center, with a more noir like ambience. Named as Hotel Cortez, the titular structure was built by James March in 1930, who was created as a rich and charming but deeply psychotic character. The season features two tormentors, The Ten Commandments Killer, who is inspired by biblical teachings, and The Addiction Demon, who wields a drill bit dildo. They are in the vein of previous seasons' Bloody Face and Rubber Man, respectively. The Halloween episode, "Devil's Night", features a dinner with "the biggest serial killers of all time", including Wuornos and John Wayne Gacy.

Set design
The hotel's two-story lobby set, along with a working elevator, was constructed over seven weeks. While no particular hotel served as inspiration, production designer Mark Worthington was influenced by Timothy Pflueger and William Van Alen when selecting patterns and schemes, stating, "Tonally, I thought Art Deco would make sense for the horror genre because it can be dark and spiky and odd and the composition is strange. It's beautiful, but it isn't necessarily inviting." The hotel consists of complicated structures housing March's murderous fantasies with dead ends, secret rooms and includes plot lines corresponding to it. A painting of Hernán Cortés, after whom the establishment is named, hangs in the reception area. Worthington and his team had a hand in creating even the smallest details, such as hotel symbols for the light fixtures, bar coasters, and a venus flytrap column carving reflecting the nature of Gaga's character. The staircase was structured in such a way as to not pull focus from the elevator, which will serve as a prime location. The exterior of the set was inspired by the James Oviatt Building in Downtown Los Angeles, while the interior decorations were modeled from the Cicada restaurant situated inside the Oviatt.

Casting

In February 2015, it was announced that American singer Lady Gaga had joined the show. Murphy stated she wanted her role in the series to be "evil". He also explained that Hotel would be devoid of any musical numbers. Instead Gaga's character, Elizabeth/The Countess, is a fashion icon and owner of the Hotel Cortez. Created as a glamorous socialite character, The Countess maintains her beauty by imbibing human blood. Murphy was so pleased with Gaga's performance that he invited her back for the yet-to-be-confirmed sixth season of the series, before Hotel had even made its debut. In March 2015, series star Jessica Lange definitively announced that she would not be returning for the fifth season. During PaleyFest 2015, it was announced that Matt Bomer and Cheyenne Jackson would co-star. Afterwards, more castings were confirmed, including Sarah Paulson, Evan Peters, Kathy Bates, and Angela Bassett. Murphy tweeted about the latter's involvement in Hotel, including a plotline with Gaga, as a character called Ramona Royale, an actress and former lover of The Countess returning to the titular hotel for revenge. Chloë Sevigny, who was a recurring special guest in Asylum, returned to the series for Hotel, playing the wife of Wes Bentley's character, a detective.

In May 2015, it was announced that Max Greenfield would also be joining the cast, in a role later revealed to be that of an addict. Greenfield had to dye his hair platinum blond for the role. His is intertwined to that of Sally's (Paulson) and together with The Addiction Demon feature "the most disturbing scene" the show had ever produced, according to Murphy. In an interview with Vanity Fair, Paulson described Sally as someone who is "selfish and greedy", with hygiene problems. The next month, Murphy announced that Denis O'Hare would return as a transgender hotel bartender. He also confirmed that Finn Wittrock would return in the new role of Tristan Duffy, a male model who is involved in a love triangle with Gaga and Bomer, and later a fated love of Liz's. Wittrock explained that the character might have similarities to his previous Freak Show character, Dandy Mott. In July 2015, Murphy stated that Emma Roberts would be returning to the series for a few episodes toward the finale, after completing filming on her Fox series, Scream Queens. Her character would be associated with James March (Peters). While promoting Scream Queens in September 2015, Roberts spoke about her role with less certainty, but optimism, stating, "...it's just everything you could dream of and more. Everything you could nightmare about and more. Granted, things over there are always changing, but I definitely want to go back to it. If it still stands, what Ryan told me, everyone's in for a great shock." However, she later confirmed that she would be unable to return, due to her demanding feature schedule. Furthermore, she did state that Murphy and her had already discussed about a "devilish" role for her in the next season, Roanoke. Despite this, she did not appear in the sixth.

Later in July, Richard T. Jones joined the cast as Detective Hahn, a homicide detective, for an eight-episode arc. That same day, Helena Mattsson announced that she had also joined the series in an unspecified role. Series alum Lily Rabe portrayed infamous serial killer Aileen Wuornos during the Halloween installment and the finale. Naomi Campbell was cast as a fashion editor who does not get along with Gaga's character. In August 2015, Murphy revealed that Mädchen Amick joined the season as a "mother of a boy who becomes ill", and shares screen time with Alex Lowe (Sevigny). Later in the month, Darren Criss was announced to guest star as a hipster that has conflicts with Iris (Bates), while Mare Winningham joined as the laundress of the Cortez, who works closely with Mr. March, in the 1920s. Christine Estabrook returned to the series as Marcy; the realtor who sold the first season's Murder House to the Harmons. Gabourey Sidibe appeared in the eleventh episode as her Coven persona Queenie. Paulson also reprised her first season role of psychic Billie Dean Howard, appearing in the final episode of the season.

Filming
Principal photography for the season began on July 14, 2015, in Los Angeles, California, marking a return to where the series shot its first two cycles (Murder House and Asylum). According to the Los Angeles Times, creative reasons, not economic factors, was the deciding key for moving the series from Louisiana back to Los Angeles since Hotels story is connected to the city. Murphy revealed a six-story hotel set was being built on the Fox lot. A dummy set of the hotel was built at Comic-Con, showing an Art Deco style building from the 1920s, inspired by the old Hollywood era. Murphy announced at the TCA Summer Press Tour in August 2015 that he would be directing the season's Halloween episode, "Devil's Night", marking the first time in series history that he will helm more than the premiere. He stated he would direct it "because I love the script so much, when we finished it I said, 'I can't give this to anybody else'." However, ultimately Murphy did not direct the episode. In an interview with Entertainment Tonight, Murphy spoke about Gaga's entrance scene, confirming it to be about six minutes long and describing it as "like a silent movie with no dialogue, and lots of blood and nudity".

Greenfield recalled that Murphy wanted to push the limits of the scenes between him, Paulson, and The Addiction Demon while admitting that it was scary. Paulson described it as a normal day of shooting for her since she was accustomed to the show's theatrics. She added, "None of it's crazy to me. I walk in, and I'm like, 'Hello, conical dildo demon person.' I don't even think twice." For The Countess and Donovan, who both suffer from blood lust, Murphy insisted on chainmail gloves being used as their weapons of choice. Costume designer Lou Eyrich created the custom gloves in the mold of armor, deriving inspiration from artist Daphne Guinness; "We wanted it to look both rock-n-roll but old at the same time. But then the nail that pops out with diamonds on the edge to slice you," said Eyrich.

Filming also took place at the Los Angeles County Museum of Art, in front of Chris Burden's art installation called Urban Light, where Gaga was seen in a floor length pink gown shooting scenes. Media reported that the filming involved a party scene with Gaga walking through the installation while singer Dinah Washington's "Coquette" played in the background. Entertainment Weeklys Tim Stack spent three days on set, where he witnessed the filming of a foursome/murder scene, involving Gaga and Bomer's characters. Murphy recounted Gaga's day of filming stating, "You write a foursome for her and you expect a lot of questions. She never did that. She showed up and she was wearing diamond pasties, a Band-Aid on her hoo-ha, heels, and a black veil that Alexander McQueen made for her on the day before his death." Additional filming for the exterior shots of the Hotel Cortez took place outside the James Oviatt Building. Other locations include the lower level of the Los Angeles Theatre at 615 South Broadway, The Majestic Downtown at 650 South Spring Street acting as John Lowe's office, the Loews Hollywood Hotel at 1755 Highland Avenue filming The Ten Commandments Killer murder scene, and Hollywood Forever Cemetery, where scenes with Gaga and Bomer were shot. Also used was the house from the first season located at 1120 Westchester Place.

O'Hare revealed that he had filmed three episodes by September 2015, with his scenes involving Bomer, Sevigny and Bates mostly. "We're kind of doing it piecemeal. You'll do five days on this one, three days on that one. You know, they always start out rocking. There's no warm-up. You're in it," the actor explained. He later went on to compare the aesthetic to Murder House, stating, "It feels like season 1 in many ways... and I think it's because we're back in LA. You can't help it!" He also revealed that his character, Liz Taylor, would be wearing a dress that Lange was supposed to wear in Coven. The actor explained that for his part, he had to shave his body including his head, and wear eye make-up, since the character was inspired by actress Elizabeth Taylor's films like BUtterfield 8 (1960) and Cleopatra (1963).

Marketing
In February 2015, Gaga tweeted a link to the first promotional video for the upcoming season with the caption "Make your reservation now. #GagaAHSHotel" announcing her presence in the season and the official title. In July 2015, a promotional trading card was unveiled by Entertainment Weekly, available at Comic-Con, where after entering the hotel set built there, one could receive the trading card with a promotional key. The first official teaser for the season was released later that month, showing Gaga's long-nailed hand ringing the bell at the front desk. In August 2015, FX revealed the premiere date of the season along with a new teaser poster, showing an Art Deco peephole on a wooden door, beyond which an obscure image revealed a blond woman putting a body to bed. Later that month, Entertainment Weekly exclusively unveiled two teaser trailers of the season, entitled "Beauty Rest" and "Do Not Disturb", set to singer Heidi Feek's cover of Elvis Presley's 1956 single, "Heartbreak Hotel".

On August 26, Entertainment Weekly revealed exclusive cast photos, along with character descriptions. Gaga also took to her Twitter account to release another photo, showing her as The Countess with three cherubic blond boys, who are seemingly sucking on bottles of blood. The singer captioned the image: "We are family. Meet my magical children. HOTEL #AHS." Murphy released three new teasers through his Twitter account, titled "Towhead", "Sleepwalk", and "Jeepers Peepers", all set to "Heartbreak Hotel". Jef Rouner from Houston Press complimented the teasers, describing them as "things of fleeting, awful beauty. So far I've seen six for this season and at least one of them is creepier than every episode of Coven combined... Each one of these is usually less than 15 seconds long and they are murderously effective. I find myself wanting to watch the show again." On September 10, 2015, an extended teaser was released, featuring a psychedelic tour of the hotel, with cameos by most of the cast. Few days later, two more trailers were released, one showed the hand of an addict, with a keyhole in place of the needle point, while the other, titled "Above & Below", portrays Gaga as The Countess, with several psychedelic intercuts inside a hotel, featuring Rammstein's "Du hast".

American retail chain Hot Topic announced on their Instagram account that starting September 28, 2015, they will launch a clothing and apparel line based on Hotel, that will be sold in-store and online. On September 16, 2015, a featurette was released, giving more details about the season and showing some footage. An actual scene from the season, released in October 2015, showed Bentley's character resting in the hotel, while Greenfield's character hiding underneath his bed. Same day the title sequence of the season was released by Murphy, consisting of the same soundtrack like previous seasons, intercut with scenes of a dirty hotel and the Ten Commandments written across a wall. Jacob Bryant from Variety was impressed with the clip, saying that "The opening credits for [American Horror Story] have always managed to be unsettling, but season five's creepy credits might top the list."

Reception

Critical response
American Horror Story: Hotel initially received more mixed reviews from critics in comparison to its predecessors. The review aggregation website Rotten Tomatoes gave the season a 64% approval rating (average episode score of 75%) with an average rating of 6.35/10 based on 214 reviews. The site's consensus reads, "Favoring garish style over effective storytelling, the fifth American Horror Story strands a talented cast at Ryan Murphy's Hotel." On Metacritic, the season was given a score of 60 out of 100 based on 24 reviews, indicating "mixed or average reviews".

Dan Fienberg of The Hollywood Reporter gave a positive review, writing, "Early on, Hotel hasn't hooked me with its storytelling, but it's always fun to see what the series does with its repertory acting company and with new additions. Throw in the normal grotesquerie and visual panache, and that should keep me going for a while, even if all of the humor appears to have been funneled into Scream Queens." Amber Dowling of TheWrap also gave a positive review, saying, "It's a visual, visceral romp into what is being set up to be another haphazard foray into the world of horror, as imagined by Murphy and his writing counterpart Brad Falchuk. The show has rarely made sense in terms of story, and this is no exception." Willa Paskin of Slate called this season a "promising new start", saying, "AHS: Hotel more obviously resembles the first two, better seasons of American Horror Story than it does the latter, lesser two."

On the other hand, Matt Zoller Seitz of New York Magazine found the season "confusing, tedious, annoyingly precious, and often ostentatiously brutal", but also praised it for being "darkly beautiful, deeply weird, and (sometimes) exhilarating." Although Scott D. Pierce from The Salt Lake Tribune praised the production design and the cinematography, he said "the storytelling is derivative; the scares are non-existent; and it's all about style without much substance." Mike Hale from The New York Times complained that it "suffers from the absence of Jessica Lange". IGNs Matt Fowler gave a rating of 5.9 out of 10, criticizing the season as "mediocre" and concluding "all weight and meaning is gone".

Gaga's performance has received mixed reviews from critics. Matt Zoller Seitz of Vulture called Gaga "terrible here in the way that Madonna was terrible in a lot of her '90s films, at once too poised and too blank." David Weiland of San Francisco Chronicle said Gaga "makes an enormous visual impact, but the minute she opens her mouth to deliver a line, it's obvious that acting just isn't one of her many talents." Ben Travers of Indiewire wrote that he "wouldn't go so far as to say Gaga's talent adds much to the proceedings, but her presence — and the manner in which its captured — certainly does." On the other hand, Emily L. Stephens from The A.V. Club and Jeff Jensen of Entertainment Weekly both gave a B- rating. Stephens praised Gaga's first appearance as "slickly exploitative and hellishly effective" while Jensen described her as "the show's most potent symbol for all of its themes about our Bad Romance with fame, fortune, sex, sex, and more sex, materialism and consumerism, the denial of death and the corrupt want for cultural immortality". Brian Lowry of Variety praised the look of Gaga's character as "gloriously photographed" and felt her addition to the show was "extraordinarily well-timed".

Awards and nominations

In its fifth season, the series has been nominated for 64 awards, 20 of which were won.

Ratings

Hotels premiere episode, "Checking In", was initially watched by 5.81 million viewers. After factoring in delayed viewing, the episode rose to 9.1 million, with 6.13 million in the 18-49 demographic, while combined linear, nonlinear and encore viewing, it drew 12.17 million viewers through October 11. Variety stated that "Checking In" could become FX's most-watched telecast, with the 60 full data tabulated. Through its first four episodes, Hotel averaged at 3.7 rating in 18-49 adult zone and 6.9 million viewers total, which is up by 7% and 1% from previous installment, Freak Show, respectively, pacing ahead of the average ratings of all prior installments on a Live +3 basis. The season finale, "Be Our Guest", initially watched by 2.24 million viewers, more than doubled its 18-49 rating with three days of delayed viewing, going from 1.1  million to 2.3  million, a 109% increase. The episode increased 94% in total viewers, upping to 4.3 million.

Home media

See also
List of vampire television series

References

External links

 
 

2015 American television seasons
2016 American television seasons
2010s American drama television series
2010s American LGBT-related drama television series
05
Demons in television
Ghosts in television
Patricide in fiction
Serial killers in television
Television series set in hotels
Television series set in the 1920s
Television shows set in Los Angeles
Transgender-related television shows
Vampires in television